Ellett is an unincorporated community in Montgomery County, Virginia, United States.

A post office was established at Ellett in 1890, and remained in operation until it was discontinued in 1910. The Blankenship Farm, Earhart House, and Trinity United Methodist Church are listed on the National Register of Historic Places.

References

Unincorporated communities in Montgomery County, Virginia
Unincorporated communities in Virginia